VirtualPBX is a privately held communications service provider offering PBX technology to manage phone tasks within offices and departments.

History
The company was founded in San Francisco in 1997 by voice-based application developer Stephen Lange—now its chief technology officer—whom the company credits with coining the term virtual PBX.

Current President and CEO Paul Hammond joined the company in 2002 from BEA Systems and in 2003, company headquarters were moved to San Jose, California.

On the technology front, the company released its skills-based routing feature in 2004 and in 2006, released a number of new features including AutoRoute, which allows calls to automatically be sent directly to ACD queues, support or sales personnel, individual extensions, or voicemail, based on the caller's area code, area code and prefix, or entire phone number.

The company acquired Open Communication Systems in 2007. Its VoIP announcement included mention of a collaboration with Gizmo5, which was formally unveiled in March 2009.

Products
VirtualPBX offers hosted phone plans for business customers. Several features are provided with each plan.

References

External links
Official website
Official website

Companies based in San Jose, California
Telecommunications companies of the United States